Kovachevich is surname. Notable people with the surname include: 

Elizabeth A. Kovachevich (born 1936)
Thomas Kovachevich (born 1942)
Pete Kovachevich

See also
 
 Kovacevich, surname
 Kovačević, surname
 Kovačevič, surname
 Kovalevich, surname
 Kovach (surname)
 Kovachich, surname
 Kovachev, surname
 Kovachevski, surname
 Kovachenko, surname

English-language surnames